La De Da is the second solo album by Joel Plaskett, released in 2005, following two albums released under the band name Joel Plaskett Emergency. The 2006 release also includes the three-song EP Make a Little Noise, by Joel Plaskett Emergency which was also released as a bonus CD with the Make a Little Noise DVD.

Track listing
All songs written by Joel Plaskett except where noted.

 "Absentminded Melody" – 1:40
 "Happen Now" – 3:28
 "Lonely Love" – 2:59
 "Lying on a Beach" – 6:02
 "Television Set" – 2:25
 "Truth Be Told" – 3:05
 "Wishing Well" (Al Tuck) – 4:06
 "Non-Believer" – 4:37
 "Nina and Albert" – 3:16
 "Paralyzed" – 3:39
 "Natural Disaster" – 5:36
 "Love This Town" – 3:30

Album credits

Personnel 
Joel Plaskett: vocals, guitars, keyboards, and "a bit of everything"
Bob Hoag: percussion and backing vocals on Tracks 2,4,7,8
Ian McGettigan: bass on Tracks 4,6,7,8
Jon Rauhouse: pedal steel on Tracks 3,4,7,11,12

Production 
Produced by Joel Plaskett, Bob Hoag, and Ian McGettigan
Recorded and Mixed at Flying Blanket in Mesa, Arizona (Summer 2004)
Mastered by Brett Zilahi at Joao Carvahlo Mastering, Toronto, Ontario (August 20, 2004)

Make a Little Noise (2006 bonus EP)

Track listing 
All songs written by Joel Plaskett.
 "A Million Dollars"
 "Nowhere with You"
 "Make a Little Noise"

Personnel 
Joel Plaskett Emergency:
Joel Plaskett: vocals and guitar
Dave Marsh: drums and vocals
Ian McGettigan: bass and vocals

Production 
Produced by Gordie Johnson
Arranged by Gordie Johnson and The Joel Plaskett Emergency

2005 albums
Joel Plaskett albums
MapleMusic Recordings albums